Long Branch is a NJ Transit commuter rail station on the North Jersey Coast Line, located in Long Branch, New Jersey, United States, and serving Long Branch, West Long Branch and Eatontown.

The current Long Branch station was built in 1988 when electrification was completed to this point and replaced an older depot. The ticket office and vending machines are located in the glass building on the center of the high platform.

Station layout

Long Branch is the terminus of diesel shuttle and electric service; a transfer is needed to continue most trips. On weekdays through train service between Bay Head and Hoboken is offered. Located in the heart of downtown Long Branch between grade crossings at Bath and Westwood Avenues, the station features a single high level island platform accessible from a crosswalk across Track 2. Passengers arriving from Bay Head destined for New York platform on the eastbound track and must change trains across the platform to an electric local or express train. Long Branch station features a large 11-track storage and maintenance yard for all New York-bound electric trains arriving and waiting to depart. During peak hours, there is direct train service from New York to Bay Head with service going to New York during the AM Rush and service from New York during the PM Rush.

Gallery

References

NJ Transit Rail Operations stations
Railway stations in the United States opened in 1875
Long Branch, New Jersey
Railway stations in Monmouth County, New Jersey
Former New York and Long Branch Railroad stations
1875 establishments in New Jersey